The Holy Trinity Church is an inter-denominational Christian church in Dubai, United Arab Emirates. It is part of the Chaplaincy of Dubai, Sharjah and the Northern Emirates. It was founded on 5 April 1970, on the land granted by the Emir of Dubai, Sheikh Rashid bin Saeed Al Maktoum.

The church has strong ties to the Anglican tradition, but the church compound is used by over 120 different Christian groups like Dubai City Church, with 10–11,000 worshippers attending weekly.

Rev Harrison Chinnakumar was appointed as Chaplain in August 2016 and was licensed by The Bishop of the Anglican Diocese of Cyprus and the Gulf, Rt Reverend Bishop Michael Lewis, who began his ministry in 2007.

Location
The Holy Trinity Church in Dubai is situated in the area of Oud Metha, and is near the St. Mary's Catholic Church, Dubai.

Chaplains
The Chaplain of Holy Trinity Church has, to date, also been the Senior Chaplain of the Chaplaincy of Dubai, Sharjah and the Northern Emirates
 
Rev Kenneth Ridgewell 1969-1971
Rev Canon Haydn Parry 1971-1972
Rev Phillip Sturdy 1972-1978
Rev John Paxton 1978-1981
Rev Phillip Saywell 1981-1984
Rev Canon Dennis Gurney 1984-2001
Rev Peter Roberts 2001-2002
Rev John Weir 2004-2010
Rev Canon Stephen Wright, Chaplain of Christ Church Jebel Ali (interregnum) 2010-2011
Rev Dr Ruwan Palapathwala 2011 to 2014
Rev Timothy Heaney (Associate Chaplain) 2012 to 2014
Rev Harrison Chinnakumar 2016

See also 
 Anglican Diocese of Cyprus and the Gulf
 Chaplaincy of Dubai, Sharjah and the Northern Emirates
 Christ Church Jebel Ali
 Mission to Seafarers
 Bishop Michael Lewis

References

Sources 
 http://www.cypgulf.org/index.php?option=com_qcontacts&view=section&Itemid=69
 http://www.oikoumene.org/en/news/news-management/eng/a/article/1634/in-dubai-christians-pray.html?tx_ttnews[cat]=113&cHash=238e679cac25143867f81c1c1b530136
 http://gulfnews.com/news/gulf/uae/community-reports/holy-trinity-church-reflects-dubai-s-ethnic-diversity-1.658812

External links 
 Anglican Diocese of Cyprus and the Gulf
 Chaplaincy of Dubai, Sharjah and the Northern Emirates
 Holy Trinity Church, Dubai
 Christ Church Jebel Ali, Dubai
 St Martin's Church, Sharjah
 St Luke's Church, Ras Al Khaimah
 St Nicholas' Church, Fujairah
 St Andrews Church, Abu Dhabi
 St Thomas' Church, Al Ain
 The Flying Angel
 Mission to Seafarers

Churches in Dubai
Anglican church buildings in the United Arab Emirates
1970 establishments in the Trucial States